This is list of archives in Vatican City.

Archives in Vatican City 

 Vatican Secret Archives
 Archive of the Congregation for the Doctrine of the Faith
 Vatican Film Library

See also 

 List of archives
 List of museums in Vatican City
 Culture of Vatican City

External links 

 
Archives
Vatican City